Jorhat College (Amalgamated)  is an undergraduate humanities college located in Jorhat, Assam, India. It offers two- and three-year degrees as well as vocational training.

History
The college was formerly two separate institutions, Jorhat College and New Jorhat College. Both formed in 1962, the former was initially a night school created to serve economically disadvantaged students, while the New Jorhat College was a day school. In 1967, the original Jorhat College began construction of its own campus. Given economic depression in the region, the two schools amalgamated in 1970 under the guidance of principal Bidyakanta Baruah. In the early 1970s, the College affiliated with Dibrugarh University. For many years the college continued offering night courses, but eventually economic difficulties forced the school to discontinue.

Golden Jubilee
Jorhat College has completed fifty years in 2012, the Golden Jubilee Celebration is going to be held in 13, 14 October 2012.

See also
 List of accredited colleges in Assam

References

External links

Educational institutions established in 1962
Universities and colleges in Assam
Education in Jorhat district
Colleges affiliated to Dibrugarh University
1962 establishments in Assam